Timi Lahti (born 28 June 1990) is a Finnish footballer currently playing for Finnish Veikkausliiga club IFK Mariehamn.

Career

Club career
A product of his local club JJK, Lahti finished his grooming at FC Haka. In 2007, he was signed by Italian club Padova, where he stayed for three years and only played for the club's youth team. In January 2010, he joined A.C. Belluno 1905 on loan from Padova where he had a successful loan stint in Serie D with 19 appearances.

However, in 2010 Lahti decided to return to Finland was signed a two-year contract with his former club Haka. However, he returned to A.C. Belluno 1905 on loan in December 2010 when the Finnish league had ended. In August 2011 he was loaned to the reigning Finnish champions, HJK with an option-to-buy after the season. He made his debut for HJK on 18 August 2011 playing as a starter against Schalke 04 in the Europa League playoff round as the Finns won by 2–0.

After his loan expired after the 2011 season he was signed permanently by HJK on a 2+1 year-contract.

During his time with the Helsinki side Lahti won three consecutive Finnish league championships from 2011 to 2013. On 1 November 2013 he was signed by his current club VPS on a 2+1 year-contract. He left the club at the end of the 2019 and joined FC Lahti for the 2020 season, signing a deal until the end of 2021.

For the 2022 season, he joined IFK Mariehamn.

References

External links

1990 births
Living people
Finnish footballers
Finland youth international footballers
Finland under-21 international footballers
Finnish expatriate footballers
JJK Jyväskylä players
Calcio Padova players
A.C. Belluno 1905 players
FC Haka players
Helsingin Jalkapalloklubi players
Vaasan Palloseura players
Klubi 04 players
FC Lahti players
IFK Mariehamn players
Veikkausliiga players
Kakkonen players
Serie D players
Association football defenders
Finnish expatriate sportspeople in Italy
Expatriate footballers in Italy
Sportspeople from Jyväskylä
21st-century Finnish people